"Hard Time" is the 91st episode of the American syndicated science fiction television series Star Trek: Deep Space Nine, the 19th episode of the fourth season.

Set in the 24th century, the series follows the adventures of the crew of the space station Deep Space Nine. In this episode, Deep Space Nine's chief of operations Miles O'Brien attempts to return to his normal life while coping with secrets from his experience of long-term incarceration.

Plot
Chief O'Brien is unjustly convicted of espionage on the planet Argratha. Instead of incarcerating convicts, the Argrathi correctional facility implants them with memories of years of imprisonment in a few hours of actual time. O'Brien experiences twenty years in prison before his fellow officers can extract him from the situation.

On returning to Deep Space Nine, O'Brien tries to adjust back to life on board the station, but his experiences while imprisoned still trouble him. Although he tells Dr. Bashir that he was alone in prison, flashbacks reveal to the audience that he had a cellmate, Ee'char, who taught him how to survive while incarcerated. He begins to exhibit habitual behaviours that he "picked up" while "incarcerated," such as hoarding food and sleeping on the hard floor instead of his bed. He begins to experience hallucinations of Ee'char.

Over time, O'Brien becomes increasingly irritable and reclusive. He has an altercation with Bashir, and assaults Quark when he has to wait to be served at Quark's bar. Captain Sisko later relieves O'Brien of duty, placing him on medical leave and ordering him to attend the counselling sessions that he has been avoiding. After he returns to his quarters, he almost hits his daughter Molly when she tries to get his attention. He flees to a cargo bay and starts tearing the place apart. Finding a weapons locker, he sets a phaser on maximum, preparing to take his own life.

Bashir follows O'Brien and finds him just in time. O'Brien tells Bashir how he killed Ee'char over a few pieces of bread that Ee'char was saving for the both of them, and that the guilt has been eating away at his conscience. O'Brien is convinced he is an animal, but Bashir tells him that if he truly were, he would have felt no regret for killing Ee'char, and so O'Brien is still human deep down inside. Bashir ultimately prescribes a new course of heavy treatment and soon has O'Brien on the way to recovery.

Reception 
In 2014, Gizmodo ranked "Hard Time" as the 42nd best episode of Star Trek, out of over 700 ones made by that time.

In 2015, Geek.com recommended this episode as "essential watching" for their abbreviated Star Trek: Deep Space Nine binge-watching guide.

In 2016, Empire ranked this the 47th best out of the top 50 episodes of all the 700 plus Star Trek television episodes.

See also
 Simulated reality

References

External links

 

1996 American television episodes
Star Trek: Deep Space Nine (season 4) episodes
Television episodes about simulated reality
Television episodes about post-traumatic stress disorder